The Rimini Baseball Club is a team that played in Serie A1 Italian Baseball League. The team is based in the city of Rimini and plays its home games at the Stadio dei Pirati since 1973.

Rimini has won 13 national championships and three European Cups during its entire history.

The club participated in the first and highest-tier level of the Italian league pyramid until 2018, then did not participate to the following 2019 Serie A.

Championship titles
1975; 1979; 1980; 1983; 1987; 1988; 1992; 1999; 2000; 2002; 2006; 2015; 2017

European Cup titles
1976; 1979; 1989

MLB alumni

Manny Alexander
Don August
Yorman Bazardo
Matt Beech
Jim Brower
Chuck Carr
Ramón Castro
Ivanon Coffie
Chris Colabello
Francisco Cruceta
Mark DiFelice
Mike Ekstrom
Pete Falcone
Tony Fiore 
Mark Funderburk
Amaury García
Brian Looney
José Malavé
Luis Maza
Juan Melo
Bry Nelson
Dave Nilsson
Ray Olmedo
Elvis Peña
Josh Phelps
Willis Roberts
Liu Rodríguez
Alex Romero
Mike Saipe
Oscar Salazar
Alex Serrano
Jason Simontacchi 
Tom Urbani
Jim Vatcher
Rick Waits

See also
 Rimini Baseball Club players

Sources
2015 Rimini roster
Rimini Baseball Club official website (Italian)
Baseball Reference – Italian Baseball League Encyclopedia and History

Baseball teams in Italy
Sport in Emilia-Romagna